Physulodes is a monotypic moth genus of the family Erebidae described by Warren in 1889. Its only species, Physulodes eupithecialis, was first described by Achille Guenée in 1854.

References

Herminiinae
Monotypic moth genera